Indo-Portuguese creoles are the several Portuguese creoles spoken in the erstwhile Portuguese Indian settlements, Cochin Portuguese Creole, Fort Bassein, Goa and Damaon, Portuguese Ceylon etc, in present-day India and Sri Lanka. These creoles are now mostly extinct or endangered, the creoles have substantial European Portuguese words in their grammars or lexicons:

 Ceylon Portuguese creole (Sri Lanka)
 Damaon and Dio Portuguese creole
 Kristi language (Chaul Portuguese creole)
 Norteiro creole (Bassein)
 Bombay Portuguese creole
 Goa Portuguese creole
 Korlai Portuguese
 Cochin Portuguese creole 
 Cannanore Portuguese creole
 Bengali Portuguese creole

The expression Indo-Portuguese may refer not only to the creoles but also to the creole people groups of Luso-Indians and Portuguese Burghers, who spoke them on the Indian subcontinent.

References

Portuguese-based pidgins and creoles
Languages of India
Portuguese diaspora in Asia
Portuguese language in Asia